New Jersey v. Delaware, 552 U.S. 597 (2008), is a United States Supreme Court case in which New Jersey sued Delaware, invoking the Supreme Court's original jurisdiction under (a), following Delaware's denial of oil company BP's petition to build a liquefied natural gas pipeline and loading facility on the New Jersey side of the Delaware River.  Delaware denied BP's petition because it violated Delaware's Coastal Zone Act. BP then sought New Jersey's approval of the project.  Delaware objected because the construction would require dredging of underwater land within Delaware's borders, which extend to the low-tide mark of the New Jersey shore. BP's proposal had not yet passed New Jersey's approval process when New Jersey and BP filed suit against Delaware.

Jurisdiction over rivers that form a border between states is usually determined by dividing the river down the middle between the states; this is not the case with the Delaware River.  Delaware-New Jersey's curious border is the result of a grant by King Charles II in 1681, when the Delaware Colony was leased by William Penn from King Charles to become the three lower counties of Pennsylvania.  The grant extended Delaware's northern border by The Twelve-Mile Circle in New Castle, Delaware, extending across the Delaware River.  If the circle were to be extended fully, it would have included a portion of New Jersey, but this was unacceptable because that land had already been granted.  As a result, the 12-Mile-Circle terminated at the mean low water mark on New Jersey's shore.  The post-1681 border gave present-day Delaware full ownership of the Delaware River along a stretch of the New Jersey border.

The case adjudicated by the Supreme Court is the third incarnation of this litigation.  The dispute over the border reaches back to the nation's creation.  A settlement was reached between the States at the beginning of the 20th century because the costs of litigation had grown too high.  The issue remained settled until New Jersey sued Delaware regarding the BP pipeline.

Opinion of the Court 
The Supreme Court appointed a special master to review. The Special Master was a practitioner in Maine who had experience in original jurisdiction land disputes. He oversaw production and heard oral arguments in the Third Circuit's court in Philadelphia, Pennsylvania. The Special Master made a recommendation to the Supreme Court, and the Court held, in a 6-2 decision, that Delaware has jurisdiction over the subaqueous soil, even though BP proposed to build on New Jersey's side of the Delaware River. 

The only two dissenting Justices (Scalia and Alito) are both from New Jersey.  Scalia wrote in his opinion, "The New Jersey-Delaware Compact of 1905 (Compact or 1905 Compact), Art. VII, 34 Stat. 860, addressed the “exercise [of] riparian jurisdiction,” and the power to “make grants … of riparian … rights.” The particular riparian right at issue here is the right of wharfing out. All are agreed that jurisdiction and power over that right were given to New Jersey on its side of the Delaware River."

Justice Stephen Breyer recused himself from the case; according to his financial disclosure form, he owned between $15,001 and $50,000 in BP stock.

References

External links
 
New York Times article about the dispute
 Today's Sunbeam, November 28, 2007.
Courier-Post, November 28, 2007
Philadelphia Inquirer

United States Supreme Court cases
United States Supreme Court cases of the Roberts Court
Internal territorial disputes of the United States
Borders of Delaware
United States Supreme Court original jurisdiction cases
Environment of Delaware
Environment of New Jersey
Borders of New Jersey
Legal history of New Jersey
2008 in United States case law
2008 in Delaware
2008 in New Jersey
2008 in the environment
BP litigation